Access Health CT is the health insurance marketplace for the U.S. state of Connecticut. Access Health CT will enable people and small businesses to purchase health insurance at federally subsidized rates.

Background 
Health insurance exchanges were established as a part of the 2010 Patient Protection and Affordable Care Act to enable individuals to purchase health insurance in state-run marketplaces. In this legislation, states could choose to establish their own health insurance exchanges; if they choose not to do so, the federal government would run one for the state.

See also 
 SustiNet (Connecticut)
 Universal Health Care Foundation of Connecticut
 List of hospitals in Connecticut

References

Further reading

External links 

 
 Harvard case study

Healthcare in Connecticut
2010s establishments in Connecticut
Connecticut law
Quasi-public agencies in Connecticut
Connecticut
Healthcare reform in the United States
United States state health legislation